Henk Dijk (4 August 1920 – 14 November 2001) was a Dutch wrestler. He competed in the men's Greco-Roman featherweight at the 1948 Summer Olympics.

References

External links
 

1920 births
2001 deaths
Dutch male sport wrestlers
Olympic wrestlers of the Netherlands
Wrestlers at the 1948 Summer Olympics
Sportspeople from Amsterdam
20th-century Dutch people
21st-century Dutch people